Stefano Brundo (born 19 May 1993) is an Argentine professional footballer who plays as a centre-back for Estudiantes BA.

Career
All Boys were the opening club of Brundo's senior career, with the defender making his pro bow for them in September 2014 during a Primera B Nacional draw with Independiente Rivadavia. He remained for a total of three seasons in tier two, prior to Brundo departing on loan to newly promoted Comerciantes Unidos of the Peruvian Primera División. Thirty-one appearances followed as they qualified for the 2017 Copa Sudamericana, netting versus Alianza Atlético (2), Real Garcilaso and Universidad San Martín in the process. He returned to All Boys for the rest of 2016–17 but didn't feature due to an admin error.

Brundo joined Atlético de Rafaela on 14 August 2017. His first appearance arrived in a win away to Gimnasia y Esgrima (J) in September, which preceded twenty-two further matches along with two goals. July 2018 saw Brundo go abroad once more by signing for Paraguayan Primera División side 3 de Febrero. However, he left the Ciudad del Este club a month later - though did appear in one competitive fixture, against Cerro Porteño at home on 13 August. A move to Mendoza with Gimnasia y Esgrima followed in mid-2018, before the defender sealed a return to Atlético de Rafaela a year later.

In January 2021, after scoring once (versus ex-club All Boys) in thirteen games back with Rafaela, Brundo headed to Peru with Primera División outfit Carlos Stein. A year later, in January 2022, he returned to his homeland, after signing with Estudiantes de Buenos Aires.

Career statistics
.

References

External links

1993 births
Living people
Footballers from Buenos Aires
Argentine footballers
Association football defenders
Argentine expatriate footballers
Expatriate footballers in Peru
Expatriate footballers in Paraguay
Argentine expatriate sportspeople in Peru
Argentine expatriate sportspeople in Paraguay
Primera Nacional players
Peruvian Primera División players
Paraguayan Primera División players
All Boys footballers
Comerciantes Unidos footballers
Atlético de Rafaela footballers
Club Atlético 3 de Febrero players
Gimnasia y Esgrima de Mendoza footballers
FC Carlos Stein players
Estudiantes de Buenos Aires footballers